Lalit Oraon (1935-2003)   was a leader of Bharatiya Janata Party from Jharkhand . He was a member of 10th and 11th Lok Sabha elected from Lohardaga.

References

1935 births
2003 deaths
Lok Sabha members from Jharkhand
India MPs 1991–1996
India MPs 1996–1997
People from Lohardaga district
Bharatiya Janata Party politicians from Jharkhand